Transvemij–Van Schilt, also known as Elro Snacks, was a Dutch professional cycling team that competed from 1980 to 1987.

The Elro Snacks company sponsored the team from 1980 to 1985. In 1985 Belgian sprinter Freddy Maertens rode for the team then known as Nikon-Van Schilt-Elro Snacks-Colnago. The team competed in one Grand Tour: the 1987 Giro d'Italia.

Major wins
1987
 Schaal Sels, Frank Verleyen
 Omloop van het Waasland, Frank Verleyen

References

External links
  Team overview of all years

Defunct cycling teams based in the Netherlands
Cycling teams based in the Netherlands
Cycling teams established in 1980
Sports clubs disestablished in 1987